Wola Kanigowska  is a village in the administrative district of Gmina Strzegowo, within Mława County, Masovian Voivodeship, in east-central Poland.

References

Wola Kanigowska